Mazujedar or Mazujdar may refer to:
 Mazujdar, Saqqez
 Mazujedar, Sarshiv, Saqqez County